The U.S. Department of Housing and Urban Development Office of Inspector General (HUD OIG) is one of the Inspector General offices created by the Inspector General Act of 1978. The Inspector General for the Department of Housing and Urban Development is charged with investigating and auditing department programs to combat waste, fraud, and abuse.

History of Inspectors General

References 

Housing and Urban Development Office of Inspector General
United States Department of Housing and Urban Development
United States Department of Housing and Urban Development agencies